Carl Einar Andreas Forseth (1892–1988) was a Swedish artist, remembered above all for his mosaics in the Golden Hall in Stockholm City Hall completed in 1923.

Early life
Born in Linköping, Forseth was the son of the Norwegian lithographer Ole Andreas Forseth. He was raised in Örebro where his father ran a lithographic business. In 1905 the family moved to Gothenburg where he attended the Arts and Crafts School (Slöjdföreningens Skola) studying under Gunnar Hallström, Anders Trulsson and Charles Lindholm. He completed his education at the Royal Swedish Academy of Arts in Stockholm (1912-1915) under Olle Hjortzberg and Oscar Björck.

Biography

During his travels to Istanbul, Greece and Italy, he developed an interest in monumental and decorative art which extended to frescos, textiles and oil paintings. From 1921 to 1923 he decorated the Golden Hall in Stockholm's City Hall with mosaics in the Byzantine style, creating the Mälar Queen as the central figure.

Examples of his stained glass creations can be seen in St Mary's Church, Helsingborg (1937), Sankt Nicolai, Halmstad (1937), St Peter and St Sigfrid's Church, Stockholm, and Coventry Cathedral, for which he also created floor mosaics in 1962. He also contributed designs to Lidköping's porcelain factory.

He was awarded the Prince Eugen Medal in 1963.

References

Literature

1892 births
1988 deaths
Swedish textile artists
Swedish ceramists
Swedish illustrators
Recipients of the Prince Eugen Medal
20th-century Swedish painters
Swedish male painters
20th-century ceramists
20th-century Swedish male artists